The Windsor Bridge or Windsor Town Bridge, an iron and granite arch bridge over the River Thames, is located between the towns of Windsor and Eton in the English county of Berkshire. The Thames Path crosses the river here. The bridge carries pedestrian and cycle traffic, and crosses the Thames just above Romney Lock. It is a Grade II listed structure.

History

It is likely that the first bridge on this site was built in the 12th century AD. By 1172 it is recorded that Osbert de Bray derived over £4 from tolls levied on vessels passing beneath the bridge. In 1242, permission was granted for oak trees to be felled in Windsor Forest for the purpose of constructing a new bridge between Windsor and Eton. By 1819 the wooden bridge, presumably rebuilt many times over its life, had deteriorated and it was decided to build a new bridge in new materials.

Description

Construction on the current bridge was started in 1822 and it opened on 1 June 1824. The bridge has three arches, each comprising seven cast iron segments, and is supported in mid-stream by two granite piers.

Built as a road bridge, tolls were originally levied on traffic crossing the bridge. Following protests and a court case, The Mayor &c. of New Windsor and ano. v Joseph Taylor, which went to the highest court at the time, these tolls were scrapped in 1897. In the 20th century the bridge carried the A332, the busy main road between Slough and Windsor.

In 1970, cracks were discovered in some of the cast iron segments, and despite local protests, but with almost equal support, it was decided to close the bridge to all motorised traffic. All such traffic between Windsor and Eton must now travel via the Queen Elizabeth Bridge on the Royal Windsor Way (formerly the Windsor and Eton relief road)  to the west. For those approaching from Old Windsor or Runnymede, the Albert Bridge provides an alternative route via Datchet's High Street.

In 2002 the bridge was refurbished, with repairs to the structure and new parapets including integral lighting. The bridge deck was replaced using Yorkstone and seating areas provided. The bridge remains in use by pedestrians and cyclists only; it provides an excellent walking route from central Windsor to Eton's High Street, and a good viewing spot for both the river and Windsor Castle.

Proximity to railway stations

See also 
Crossings of the River Thames

References

External links
 The Royal Windsor website. The Town Bridge, Windsor, 1824. Retrieved 16 January 2006.
 Windsor Berkshire website. Eton Bridge, Windsor. Retrieved 17 March 2010.

Bridges across the River Thames
Pedestrian bridges across the River Thames
Bridges completed in 1824
Bridges in Berkshire
Buildings and structures in Windsor, Berkshire
Cast-iron arch bridges in England
Former toll bridges in England
Grade II listed buildings in Berkshire
Eton, Berkshire
Grade II listed bridges